Gogapur is a census town in tehsil Mehidpur City and Ujjain district in the Indian state of Madhya Pradesh.This town is commonly known as Mehidpur Road and Mehidpur Mandi.

Geography
It has an average elevation of 486 metres (1,594 feet).

Demographics
 India census, Gogapur had a population of 6,371. Males constitute 51% of the population and females 49%. Gogapur has an average literacy rate of 65%, higher than the national average of 59.5%: male literacy is 76%, and female literacy is 54%. In Gogapur, 16% of the population is under 6 years of age.

Transport

Railway 

Mahidpur Road is well connected to nearby major stations Nagda Ujjain and Ratlam Kota, which connect Delhi-Mumbai main line, Mumbai- New Delhi line via Kota Junction.
Jodhpur indore ranthambore exp

Road

Road is well connected to transport. 
Form Nagda 15km, from Mahidpur city 19km, from Ujjain District 72km.a full AC bus started between  mahidpur road to ujjain.

References

Villages of Ujjain district